Maja is a genus of majid crabs erected by Jean-Baptiste Lamarck in 1801. It includes the following extant species:

Maja africana Griffin & Tranter, 1996
Maja bisarmata Rathbun, 1916
Maja brachydactyla Balss, 1922
Maja capensis Ortmann, 1894
Maja compressipes (Miers, 1879)
Maja confragosa Griffin & Tranter, 1996
Maja crispata Risso, 1827
Maja erinacea de Ninni, 1924
Maja gibba Alcock, 1899
Maja goltziana d'Oliviera, 1888
Maja gracilipes Chen & Ng, 1999
Maja japonica Rathbun, 1932
Maja kominatoensis Kubo, 1936
Maja linapacanensis Rathbun, 1916
Maja miersii Walker, 1887
Maja sakaii Takeda & Miyake, 1969
Maja spinigera (De Haan, 1837)
Maja squinado (Herbst, 1788)
Maja suluensis Rathbun, 1916
Maja tuberculata De Haan, 1839

A further 12 species are known from fossils.

References

Majoidea
Decapod genera